Ambt Almelo is a former municipality in the Dutch province of Overijssel. It covered the area around the city centre of Almelo. In 1913, the municipality was merged with the municipality of Almelo.

See also
Stad Almelo

Former municipalities of Overijssel
Almelo